Drumgooland is a civil parish in County Down, Northern Ireland. It is situated mainly in the historic barony of Iveagh Upper, Lower Half, with one townland in the barony of Iveagh Lower, Lower Half.

Settlements
The civil parish contains the following settlements:
Leitrim
Moneyslane

Townlands
Drumgooland civil parish contains the following townlands:

Backaderry
Ballydrumman
Ballymackilreiny
Ballymaginaghy
Ballymagreehan
Ballyward
Benraw
Clanmaghery
Cloghskelt
Deehommed
Derryneill
Drumadonnell
Drumlee
Gargarry
Legananny
Leitrim
Magheramayo
Moneyslane
Slievenaboley

See also
List of civil parishes of County Down

References